Qara Gol may refer to:
 Qara Gol, Hamadan
 Qaragol, Kurdistan
 Qara Gol, Sanandaj, Kurdistan Province
 Qaragol, Zanjan